Açelya Topaloğlu (born 19 November 1986) is a Turkish actress.

Life and career
Topaloğlu first became interested in dancing at a young age, and received modern dance training at Tan Sağtürk Dance Club. She briefly joined the Anadolu Ateşi dance group. As she enrolled in university, through her mother's support she participated in different plays as an actress. Between 2008 and 2009, she got musical education at MSM-Actor Studio and graduated from MSM-Conservatory with a degree in theatre studies in 2013.

In 2008, she made her television debut with a role in Aşk Yakar. In 2009, she briefly appeared in Arka Sokaklar and in 2012 joined the cast of Eve Düşen Yıldırım. In 2015, she was cast in her first leading role in the TV series Kaçak Gelinler, portraying the character of Almila. Her breakthrough came with the teen drama İnadına Aşk, in which she played the role of Defne.

Topaloğlu also pursued a career on stage with roles in the plays Sersefil Müzikali, Temel İçgüdü, Tersine Dünya and Kadınlar Filler ve Saireler. In 2016, she became a judge on the contest Görevimiz Komedi. In the TV series Meryem, she portrayed the character of Derin, which was well received by critics. She performed different roles in theatre "Güldür Güldür Show".

Filmography

Music videos 
 2014 - Gökhan Türkmen - "Sen İstanbulsun"

Awards and nominations

References

External links 
 
 

1986 births
Living people
Turkish television actresses
Turkish film actresses
Turkish stage actresses
21st-century Turkish actresses